ATPase Domain 3B (ATAD3B) is a protein that in humans is encoded by the ATAD3B gene.  ATAD3 is part of the AAA protein family. The function of ATAD3B is not yet well understood by the scientific community. In humans the gene is located at 1p36.33.

Function 

ATAD3B is associated with the mitochondria. The C terminus is anchored in the mitochondrial inter membrane space.

The protein is linked with the pluripotency of stem cells. The ATAD3A gene is targeted by c-Myc which is one of four factors needed to create induced pluripotent stem (i-PS) cells from mouse embryonic fibroblasts(MEFs).

Its expression is linked to cell cycle function and tumor growth. When ATAD3B was overexpressed, cell duplication took an extra three hours by spending a longer time in G1 phase. Abnormal expression levels of ATAD3B has been linked to chemoresistance. Overexpression of ATAD3B was the found to be the strongest factor in breast cancer survival rates.

Characteristics 
A mutation in the stop codon means that ATAD3B has a 62 amino acid longer UTR.

References 

Induced stem cells
Proteins